The 2015 Men's Summer Universiade Volleyball Tournament was the 28th edition of the event, organized by the Summer Universiade. It was held in Gwangju , South Korea from 2–12 July 2015.

Results

All times are Korea Standard Time (UTC+09:00)

Preliminary round

Group A

|}

|}

Group B

|}

|}

Group C

|}

|}

Group D

|}

|}

Final round

17th–21st Places

17th–21st Quarterfinals

|}

17th–20th semifinals

|}

19th place match

|}

17th place match

|}

9th–16th places

9th–16th quarterfinals

|}

13th–16th semifinals

|}

9th–12th semifinals

|}

15th place match

|}

13th place match

|}

11th place match

|}

9th place match

|}

1st-8th

Quarterfinals

|}

5th–8th semifinals

|}

Semifinals

|}

7th place match

|}

5th place match

|}

3rd place match

|}

Final

|}

Final standing

References

External links
Official website

Volleyball at the Summer Universiade
2015 in volleyball
2015 Summer Universiade events